Rautenbach is a surname. Notable people with the surname include:

Billy Rautenbach (born 1959), Zimbabwean businessman
Conrad Rautenbach (born 1984), Zimbabwean rally driver
Faan Rautenbach (born 1976), South African rugby union player
Jans Rautenbach (1936–2016), South African screenwriter, film producer, and director